Thirumangalam Sree Maha Vishnu Siva Temple is an ancient Hindu temple dedicated to Vishnu and Shiva at Engandiyur of Thrissur District in Kerala state in India. The presiding deity of the temple are Maha Vishnu and Shiva, located in separate sanctum sanatoriums, facing East. According to folklore, Shiva Linga is swayabhu and sage Parashurama has installed the idol. The temple is a part of the 108 famous Shiva temples in Kerala.

See also
 108 Shiva Temples
 Temples of Kerala
 Hindu temples in Thrissur Rural
 Temple Website

References

108 Shiva Temples
Shiva temples in Kerala
Hindu temples in Thrissur district